NFL Classics is a series of videotaped rebroadcasts of National Football League games that air on the NFL Network.  The show airs weekly during the offseason and also occasionally during the NFL season. As of the 2010, the series airs on Monday night while Super Bowl Classics airs on Friday night.

The program, the first such series to air on any American television network, premiered on May 10, 2007 with a re-air of the Chicago Bears' Monday Night Football comeback victory over the Arizona Cardinals in 2006.

NFL Classics is an extension of an earlier series called Super Bowl Classics, which showed full-length re-airs of some of the most memorable Super Bowl games.

The NFL is the last United States-based major professional sports league to make such broadcasts available on TV.  Previously, NFL Network and ESPN Classic had aired NFL's Greatest Games, 90-minute edited versions using footage from NFL Films.  The other major leagues – MLB, NBA, NHL, and NASCAR – have all had games (or races, in NASCAR's case) air on ESPN Classic.  However, at this time, full-length MLB games are shown on Classic only occasionally, while NHL games are presently aired on NHL Network.

Episode list

Super Bowl Classics

2007
January 11, 2007 – Super Bowl XL: Pittsburgh Steelers 21, Seattle Seahawks 10
January 15, 2007 – Super Bowl XXXII: Denver Broncos 31, Green Bay Packers 241
January 15, 2007 – Super Bowl XXII: Washington Redskins 42, Denver Broncos 10
January 18, 2007 – Super Bowl XXXVI: New England Patriots 20, St. Louis Rams 17
January 22, 2007 – Super Bowl XIII: Pittsburgh Steelers 35, Dallas Cowboys 312
January 25, 2007 – Super Bowl XXV: New York Giants 20, Buffalo Bills 19
January 29, 2007 – Super Bowl XXXIV: St. Louis Rams 23, Tennessee Titans 16
February 1, 2007 – Super Bowl XXXVIII: New England Patriots 32, Carolina Panthers 29
February 3, 2007 – Super Bowl XXIII: San Francisco 49ers 20, Cincinnati Bengals 16
February 3, 2007 – Super Bowl III: New York Jets 16, Baltimore Colts 7
1This was not on the original NFLN schedule; it replaced a scheduled telecast of the Las Vegas All-American Classic, which was cancelled2The last minute of the first half (including the Rocky Bleier touchdown reception) was missing from the footage.

2008
This schedule reflects only game re-airs that NFL Network did not show the previous year.  Also, most of the premieres tied into the participating teams in Super Bowl XLII and to the 1972 Miami Dolphins, the only perfect team for an entire season in NFL history.
January 21, 2008- Super Bowl XLI: Indianapolis Colts 29, Chicago Bears 17
January 23, 2008- Super Bowl XX: Chicago Bears 46, New England Patriots 10
January 25, 2008- Super Bowl XXXIII: Denver Broncos 34, Atlanta Falcons 19
January 27, 2008- Super Bowl XXXI: Green Bay Packers 35, New England Patriots 21
January 28, 2008- Super Bowl XXI: New York Giants 39, Denver Broncos 20
January 31, 2008- Super Bowl XXX: Dallas Cowboys 27, Pittsburgh Steelers 17
February 1, 2008- Super Bowl XXXIX: New England Patriots 24, Philadelphia Eagles 21
February 2, 2008- Super Bowl VII: Miami Dolphins 14, Washington Redskins 7

NFL Classics

May 2007
May 10, 2007 – Chicago Bears 24, Arizona Cardinals 23, October 16, 2006 (2006 Chicago Bears–Arizona Cardinals game)
May 17, 2007 – Indianapolis Colts 38, Tampa Bay Buccaneers 35 in OT, October 6, 2003, the Colts trailed by 21 points with five minutes left in Tony Dungy's first game back in Tampa Bay.
May 24, 2007 – New York Jets 40, Miami Dolphins 37 in OT, October 23, 2000 (The Monday Night Miracle)
May 31, 2007 – Buffalo Bills 41, Houston Oilers 38 in OT, January 3, 1993 (The Comeback)

June 2007
June 7, 2007 – New England Patriots 16, Oakland Raiders 13 in OT, January 19, 2002: A controversial call in the Tuck Rule Game and two Adam Vinatieri field goals in a driving snowstorm in the final game at Foxboro Stadium lead the Patriots to their future Super Bowl dynasty.
June 14, 2007 – Indianapolis Colts 38, New England Patriots 34, January 21, 2007: Down 21–6 at halftime, Peyton Manning led the Colts to 32 second-half points in a comeback victory over Tom Brady and the New England Patriots in the 2006 AFC Championship Game.
June 21, 2007 – Green Bay Packers 33, Seattle Seahawks 27 in OT, January 4, 2004 – As Mike Holmgren coaches against his former Packers team, Matt Hasselbeck's boasts after the overtime coin flip, "We want the ball, and we're gonna score!"  But the brag backfires as Al Harris scores the game-winning interception return touchdown.
June 28, 2007 – San Francisco 49ers 39, New York Giants 38 January 5, 2003: In one of the largest comebacks in NFL history. the 49ers rally from a three-touchdown deficit late in the third quarter of the NFC Wild Card game to win by scoring 25 unanswered points.  However, a chaotic play caused by a botched field goal attempt decides the outcome.

July 2007
July 5, 2007 – Cleveland Browns 33, Pittsburgh Steelers 36, January 5, 2003: Led by quarterback Tommy Maddox, the Steelers scored 29 points in the final 19 minutes of the 2002 AFC wild card game to defeat the Cleveland Browns 36–33. Maddox, the NFL Comeback Player of the Year, passed for 367 yards and three touchdowns.
July 12, 2007 – Green Bay Packers 41, Oakland Raiders 7, December 22, 2003: The day after his father's death, Brett Favre completes 22 of 30 passes for 399 yards and four touchdowns as the Packers dominated the Raiders 41–7 on Monday Night Football. Favre set a Packers record recording a 154.9 quarterback rating in the victory.
July 19, 2007 – Oakland Raiders 25, Denver Broncos 24, November 28, 2004: Broncos kicker Jason Elam's 42-yard field goal attempt late in the fourth quarter was blocked by Langston Walker to preserve a 25–24 victory for the Raiders on a snowy night in Denver. Raiders quarterback Kerry Collins passed for 339 yards and four touchdowns.
July 29, 2007 – Chicago Bears 27, Minnesota Vikings 33 in OT, December 1, 1994

December 2007
Except for the Dec. 8 and 21 games, all of these contests promoted the December 28 game between the New England Patriots and the New York Giants which was shown on NFLN, CBS, and NBC in a three-way simulcast.
December 8, 2007 – New England Patriots 23, Pittsburgh Steelers 20, September 25, 2005: Tied 20–20 with 1:21 minutes left thanks to a Ben Roethlisberger four-yard touchdown to Hines Ward, Tom Brady led the Patriots to a drive ending with a last-second, 43-yard field goal by Adam Vinatieri. 
December 21, 2007 – Miami Dolphins 29, New England Patriots 28, December 20, 2004: Trailing 28–17, underdog Miami comes back to win against the heavily favored Patriots thanks to a rushing touchdown by Sammy Morris, a passing touchdown by A. J. Feeley, and two late interceptions by Tom Brady in the last 2:17.
December 26, 2007 – New England Patriots 38, New York Jets 14 September 9, 2007: The Patriots win against the Jets in a game that began New England's 16–0 run and was most remembered as the game in which Patriots cornerback Ellis Hobbs recorded the longest kickoff return in NFL history (108 Yards).
December 26, 2007 – New England Patriots 24, Indianapolis Colts 20 November 4, 2007: In a game that was built up as "Super Bowl 41½", The Patriots ended up winning and continuing its run to a 16–0 record thanks to two touchdown passes by Tom Brady late in the game when the Colts were leading by 10 points.   
December 27, 2007 – New England Patriots 31, Philadelphia Eagles 28, November 26, 2007: The Patriots ended up beating a tougher-than-expected Philadelphia squad to continue their quest for an undefeated season in what was New England's closest game of that season.
December 28, 2007 – New England Patriots 27, Baltimore Ravens 24, December 3, 2007: Thanks to a few penalties in New England's favor and a good final drive, the Patriots were able to go 12–0 on a  Monday night in what would be a 16-0 regular season in a game many people said should've been won by Baltimore.  Despite leading 27–24, the Patriots did not secure the win until a last-second desperation heave by Kyle Boller was caught at the Patriots 2-yard line by Derrick Mason and stopped. This game was the most watched program in cable television history.

January 2008
January 17, 2008 – New England Patriots 24, San Diego Chargers 21, January 14, 2007: In a game with the teams combining 7 turnovers, Nate Kaeding misses a game-tying field goal with :08 seconds left to give the New England Patriots the victory over the favored Chargers and a spot in the AFC Championship Game for the fourth time in five years.
January 18, 2008 – Green Bay Packers 35, New York Giants 13, September 16, 2007: Packers' quarterback Brett Favre becomes the winningest quarterback in NFL history beating the Giants, the same team the Packers would lose to later in the season in the 2007 NFC Championship Game. 
January 24, 2008 – New England Patriots 38, New York Giants 35, December 29, 2007: The Patriots beat the Giants, a team which they would meet 1 month later in Super Bowl XLII, to rewrite history and complete a perfect 16-0 regular season. This would also be the game many regular season NFL records were broken, such as Tom Brady breaking Peyton Manning's single – season TD passes record with 50 and Randy Moss breaking Jerry Rice's single- season TD catches record with 23.
January 25, 2008 – New York Giants 23, Green Bay Packers 20 in OT, January 20, 2008: On a chilly, below temperature night in Green Bay, Wisconsin, Lawrence Tynes made a game- winning field goal  with 12:34 in overtime after missing two straight in the last seven minutes of regulation to get the Giants a victory in the 2008 NFC Championship Game and a spot in Super Bowl XLII, which they would eventually win.

June 2008
Beginning with this season, NFL Classics is a new series of 2½ to 3 hour programs with opening and closing sequences and some editing.  This was scheduled to run on Monday nights for 10 weeks.

June 2, 2008 – Miami Dolphins 28, New York Jets 24, November 27, 1994: With the Jets leading 24–6 in the third quarter of a game that, if won by New York, would result in a first-place tie with Miami in the AFC East, Dan Marino throws two more touchdown passes to Mark Ingram to cut the lead to three. Then with just over 2 minutes left in regulation, Marino led a last-minute drive that culminated in a "fake spike" pass where Marino pretended to spike the ball (which would stop the clock) before throwing the winning touchdown pass to Ingram with 22 seconds left (the Clock Play).
June 9, 2008 – Cincinnati Bengals 27, San Diego Chargers 7 January 10, 1982 (the Freezer Bowl): In one of the coldest games in NFL history, with a wind chill falling below -35 degrees Fahrenheit, the Bengals were the only team able to deal with the weather thanks to a solid performance on defense and on offense (led by a three touchdown performance by Cincinnati's quarterback and 1981's NFL Most Valuable Player Award winner, Ken Anderson) to win the AFC Championship Game and move on to Super Bowl XVI, although they lost to the San Francisco 49ers.
June 16, 2008 – Baltimore Ravens 39, Jacksonville Jaguars 36 September 10, 2000
June 23, 2008 – Tennessee Titans 22, Buffalo Bills 16 January 8, 2000: This is the game where the Music City Miracle occurred. Following a late field goal by Bills kicker Steve Christie, Buffalo kicked off and the ball was recovered by Titan fullback Lorenzo Neal. Neal handed off to tight end Frank Wycheck who lateraled the ball to receiver Kevin Dyson, who ran in for a touchdown with 3 seconds remaining. The play was ruled as a lateral, and thus a legal play instead of an illegal forward pass, by Phil Luckett after instant replay.
June 30, 2008 – Green Bay Packers 24, Cincinnati Bengals 23 September 20, 1992: This game is where Brett Favre's career officially began, as he was forced into the game in the 1st quarter in place of injured Don Majkowski.  Favre started slow, as the Packers trailed 17–3 in the 4th quarter, but rallied, throwing his first NFL  touchdown pass to Sterling Sharpe in the 4th quarter.  Trailing 23–17 with just over a minute left, Favre drove the team down the field, completing the winning touchdown throw with just 13 seconds remaining, and since then, he has started every game for the Green Bay Packers through the 2007 season.

See also
America's Game: The Super Bowl Champions
List of Super Bowl broadcasters

External links
Announcement of program

Classics
Classics
2007 American television series debuts
2010s American television series